WYSC (102.7 FM, "Star 102.7") is a radio station broadcasting a classic hits music format. Licensed to McRae, Georgia, United States, the station is currently owned by Cinecom Broadcasting Systems, Inc.

Along with the affiliated AM station WYIS, the two stations are still incorrectly marked as WDAX-AM by Google Maps.

References

External links

YSC
Classic hits radio stations in the United States